DaeSeob Han (born February 6, 1977 in Seoul) is a South Korean composer of European classical music, based in Korea and Germany.

Han writes concert music (chamber and orchestral works) as well as contemporary art.

Biography
2013 Konzertexamen Komposition HfM Weimar
2009 Diplom K.A. Komposition HfM Weimar
2007 Vordiplom Komposition Hochschule für Musik "Franz Liszt", Weimar, Germany

Selected works
2014 Kentridge in the Moon for Flute, Violin, Cello and Percussion 
2014 Words of Warning for Reader and Brass Ensemble
2014 Vertigo for violin solo
2013 Her Gentle Gaze for flute, clarinet, violin, cello, percussion and piano 
2013 Oz's Wonderful Adventures for piano solo
2012 Polyptyque lumineux pour orchestre  
2012 20Hz for string quartet  
2011 Amorphing for large orchestra
2008 Evening air for violin, cello and piano
2006 Das Flüstern einer Sirene für Flöte Solo

Awards
2014 The 32nd ACL Conference and Festival in Japan 
2013 "Hwaum Project Festival", Call for Score 
2013 International Composition Competition for Orchestra of Weimarer Frühjahrstage für zeitgenössische Musik, 1st Prize and Audience Award, Date: 06. Apr. 2013, Place: E-Werk Weimar in Germany, Performance: Jenaer Philharmonie, Conductor: Marcus L. Frank
2011 National Creative Music Festival in Korea 
2010 The Molinari Quartet's Fourth International Composition Competition in Canada, 3rd Prize, Date: 14. May. 2009, Place: Chapelle historique du Bon-Pasteur in Canada, Performance: Quartuor Molinari 
2008 Camillo Togni' International Composition competition in Italy, Date: 24. Nov. 2008, Place: Auditorium San Barnaba-Brescia in Italy, Performance: Dedalo Ensemble, Conductor: Vittorio Parisi
2007 National Composition Competition of Music Colleges in Germany, 1st Prize, Date: 22. May. 2006, Place: Konzertsaal der HfMDK Stuttgart 
2007 International Pan Music Festival under the direction of the ISCM Section 
2002 DaeJeon International Contemporary Music Festival
1999 Nanpa Music Festival Composition Prize, 3rd Prize
1997 Seoul contemporary music festival

References

External links

1977 births
South Korean classical composers
21st-century classical composers
Living people
Musicians from Seoul